The Ace Scooter is an American aircraft that was designed for homebuilt construction.

Design and development
The Ace Scooter is a single place, strut-braced, high wing aircraft with conventional landing gear, which is steel. The tractor engine is mounted above the wing. The open cockpit has a short rounded nose. The fuselage is of wood construction with aircraft fabric covering.

Specifications (Scooter)

References

Homebuilt aircraft
High-wing aircraft
Single-engined tractor aircraft